Epsilon Arietis (ε Ari, ε Arietis) is the Bayer designation for a visual binary star system in the northern constellation of Aries. It has a combined apparent visual magnitude of 4.63 and can be seen with the naked eye, although the two components are too close together to be resolved without a telescope. It is located behind the dark cloud MBM12.

The brighter member of this pair has an apparent magnitude of 5.2. Both are A-type main sequence stars with a stellar classification of A2 Vs. (The 's' suffix indicates that the absorption lines in the spectrum are distinctly narrow.) In the 2009 Catalogue of Ap, HgMn and Am stars, the two stars have a classification of A3 Ti, indicating they are Ap stars with an anomalous abundance of titanium. Within the measurement margin of error, their projected rotational velocities are deemed identical at 60 km/s.

Name
This star system, along with δ Ari, ζ Ari, π Ari, and ρ3 Ari, were Al Bīrūnī's Al Buṭain (ألبطين), the dual of Al Baṭn, the Belly. According to the catalogue of stars in the Technical Memorandum 33-507 - A Reduced Star Catalog Containing 537 Named Stars, Al Buṭain were the title for five stars :δ Ari as Botein, π Ari as Al Buṭain I, ρ3 Ari as Al Buṭain II, ε Ari as Al Buṭain III and ζ Ari as Al Buṭain IV

In Chinese astronomy, Epsilon Arietis may be or may be part of Tso Kang (from Cantonese  zogang, Mandarin pronunciation zuǒgēng).

References

External links
 HR 887
 Image Epsilon Arietis

018519
Double stars
013914
Arietis, Epsilon
Aries (constellation)
A-type main-sequence stars
Arietis, 48
Durchmusterung objects
0887